"Strange" is a 1991 song by female group En Vogue, and appears on their first compilation album, Remix to Sing. It is known as "Strange (House Remix)", the original version is from their debut album, Born to Sing. A commercial single was never officially released, the song was only serviced to dance clubs in the US and UK. It peaked at #44 on the U.S Billboard Dance chart. It was their final single from the album.

The song features Maxine Jones and Dawn Robinson on lead vocals.

Critical reception
Edward Hill from The Plain Dealer noted that the song "swings on the new-jack tip". David Quantick from Smash Hits described it as "slow" and "velvety" in his review of Born to Sing.

Charts

References

1991 singles
En Vogue songs
Songs written by Thomas McElroy
Songs written by Denzil Foster
1991 songs
Atlantic Records singles